The Jones Memorial Methodist Church is a historic church building at 400 East Main Street in Hartford, Arkansas.  It is a T-shaped two story brick building, with a gabled roof and stone foundation.  Its main facade has a Classical Revival appearance, with a gabled portico sheltering the main entrance, supported by six large Doric columns.  Built in 1921, it is the only major example of the architectural style in the small city.  The $25,000 cost of its construction was a burden on the congregation, and its mortgage was paid off in the 1930s by Dr. Elisha Baxter Jones, in whose honor the church was thereafter named.

The building was listed on the National Register of Historic Places in 2011.

See also
National Register of Historic Places listings in Sebastian County, Arkansas

References

Methodist churches in Arkansas
Churches on the National Register of Historic Places in Arkansas
Neoclassical architecture in Arkansas
Churches completed in 1921
Churches in Sebastian County, Arkansas
National Register of Historic Places in Sebastian County, Arkansas
Neoclassical church buildings in the United States